Gonepteryx cleopatra, the Cleopatra or Cleopatra butterfly, is a medium-sized butterfly of the family Pieridae.

Subspecies
The species Gonepteryx cleopatra is divided into the following ten subspecies:
G. c. cleopatra (Linnaeus, 1767) – North Africa, Portugal, Spain, Sicily
G. c. balearica Bubacek, 1920 – Balearic Islands
G. c. petronella De Freina, 1977 – Ibiza
G. c. italica (Gerhardt, 1882) – Italy, France, Corsica, Sardinia
G. c. dalmatica Verity, 1908 – Dalmatian coast, western Balkan
G. c. citrina Sheljuzhko, 1925 – southern Greece
G. c. insularis Verity, 1909 – Crete
G. c. fiorii Turati & Fiori, 1930 – Rhodes
G. c. taurica (Staudinger, 1881) – Anatolia, Syria, Jordan, Israel, Cyprus
G. c. palmata Turati, 1921 – Cyrenaica, Libya

Appearance
Gonepteryx cleopatra is a medium-sized butterfly with a wingspan of about 50–70 mm (2.0-2.8 in). It is a sexually dimorphic species - the female has pale yellow or greenish wings, the male is darker yellow with an orange patch on the forewing. Both sexes have a forewing apical hook and brown dots in the center of each wing, and the underside of wings is light greenish yellow. The greenish color, the shape and the pronounced venation on the hindwings give to these butterflies a good camouflage, making them resemble just leaves.

Ecology
The Cleopatra butterfly inhabits open woodland and scrub. The flight period is from May to August in most parts of its range, except Spain, where it is double brooded and may fly almost all year. The adult hibernates in evergreen trees and shrubs. The caterpillars feed on the buckthorns Rhamnus alaternus. When the green caterpillars are prepared to pass to the pupal stage, they tie themselves through a silk belt to the host plant, on the underside of a leaf. The green chrysalis became gradually yellow and red, revealing the colors on the wings of the adult close to flutter.

Distribution
This species is native to the Mediterranean region (Southern Europe, North Africa and West Asia).

References
 Tristan Lafranchis - Quand les papillons changent d'habitat
 Bernard d'Abrera, Butterflies of the Holarctic Region, Part I, Hill House, Victoria 1990, S.98
 Tom Tolman/Richard Lewington, Collins Butterfly Guide, HarperCollins, London 1997
 Funet.fi
 Learn about butterflies
 Lepinet.fr

External links
 Papillon-poitou-charentes
  Moths and Butterflies of Europe and North Africa

Gonepteryx
Butterflies of Africa
Butterflies of Asia
Butterflies of Europe
Butterflies described in 1767
Taxa named by Carl Linnaeus